From the 1950s through the early 2000s, 3M disposed of per- and polyfluoroalkyl substances produced during the manufacturing process of various industrial products in four dumping sites in Minnesota. These chemicals have contaminated the groundwater of over 170,000 residents of the Twin Cities East Metro Area, culminating in an $850 million settlement with the State of Minnesota in 2018.

Background of PFAs

PFAs 
Per- and Polyfluoroalkyl Substances – also known as PFAs – are widely used, long lasting chemicals found in many consumer, commercial, and industrial products. Breaking down very slowly in the environment, PFAs have been found in water, air, fish, soil, the blood of humans and animals, and food products around the world.

Timeline of Use by 3M 
Although processes for the commercial production of PFAs were developed in the 1940s, it was not until the late 1950s that 3M began to utilize them in their products. The first significant success from PFAs for 3M came from the sale of firefighting foam to the Navy in the 1960s. By the 1970s, 3M was aware of the environmental dangers of PFAs and began their "Pollution Prevention Pays", preventing over 2.5 million tons of waste from entering landfills. Since then, 3M has continued to use PFAs in a variety of products, with Scotchgard being the most well known and commercially lucrative. Until the early 2000s, waste from the production of PFAs was dumped at four sites in Minnesota, the Washington County Landfill, the 3M COttage Grove Chemolite Site, the 3M Woodbury site, and the 3M Oakdale site.

Scotchgard 
Scotchgard is a stain and water repellent applied primarily to fabric and furniture to protect them from stains. Despite making up over $300 million in sales, Scotchgard was discontinued in 2000, with 3M citing issues of environmental concerns and corporate responsibility as the primary reasons. However, just two years later, in 2002, 3M released a new "greener" version of Scotchgard which still contained PFAs.

Communities Affected

Populations 

The drinking water of 14 communities, over 170,000 individuals, and over 150 square miles was contaminated through 3M's improper disposal of chemicals. Some of these communities include Lake Elmo, Oakdale, Baytown, West Lakeland Townships, Lakeland, Lakeland Shores, St. Paul Park, Newport, and Woodbury.

Natural Resources 
The affected area is surrounded by both the Mississippi and St. Croix Rivers, contains Afton State Park, Lake Elmo Park Reserve, St. Croix Bluffs Regional Park, and Battle Creek Regional Park.

Health Implications 
The health impacts of PFAs remained highly debated and not fully understood . The National Institute of Environmental Health Sciences (NIEHS), Environmental Protection Agency (EPA), Food and Drug Administration (FDA), and Center for Disease Control's Agency for Toxic Substances and Disease Registry (ATSDR) are all conducting ongoing studies to assess the implications of exposure to PFAs on the body and/or awarding grants to universities for the study of PFAs. However, no conclusions have been reached yet.

Consequences for 3M

Media Coverage 
Numerous media outlets have covered the environmental issues surrounding 3M's dumping of PFAs since the late 1990s, with most news coverage being local to Minnesota, Like the Pioneer Press and Star Tribune, and some coverage coming from more notable sources like the New York Times.

Legal Trial and Settlement 
Following initial discoveries of groundwater contamination in 2002, the Minnesota Department of Health conducted numerous studies –concluding in 2008, 2010, and 2014 – on the level of PFAs found in the bloodstreams of exposed residents. On February 20, 2018, the state of Minnesota settled its lawsuit against 3M in exchange for $850 million. After legal expenses, approximately $720 million will be invested in drinking water and other natural resource projects in the east metro area.

Next Steps

Mitigation and Remediation 
3M has invested over $200 million, not including legal settlements, into the mitigation and remediation of PFAs around the world. Their website offers samples of PFAs and other chemicals used in their products to any researchers studying the environment and the long-term effects of chemicals. Based on varying population growth and development scenarios, Minnesota state agencies have mapped out 18 unique scenarios for the treatment of individual families' well-water and municipal water systems. The most expensive of these scenarios has an initial estimated cost of $1.2 billion, which is roughly $500 million more than the funding provided to affected communities by 3M.

Changes in Practices 

Although 3M has not used the four primary dumping sites which produced the groundwater contamination for the disposal of PFAs since the early 2000s, they continue to produce products containing PFAs. However, the awareness of PFA contamination has greatly increased the resources provided to their effective containment, particularly in the United States.

References

 https://www.health.state.mn.us/communities/environment/hazardous/topics/sites.html

Water pollution in the United States
Environmental disasters in the United States
Water in Minnesota
Health in Minnesota
Diseases and disorders in the United States
3M
Water supply and sanitation in the United States